Longitarsus exsoletus is a species of beetle in the subfamily Galerucinae that can be found everywhere in Europe (except for North Macedonia) and in Central Russia.

References

E
Beetles described in 1758
Beetles of Europe
Taxa named by Carl Linnaeus